Climate change in Iraq is resulting in effects that are making Iraq's environmental, security, political, and economic challenges worse. Rising temperatures, intense droughts, declining precipitation, desertification, salinization, and the increasing prevalence of dust storms have undermined Iraq’s agricultural sector. Additionally, Iraq’s water security is based on the declining Tigris–Euphrates river system. National and regional political uncertainty will make mitigating the effects of climate change and addressing transnational water management very difficult. Climatic changes such as increasing temperatures, reduced precipitation, and increasing water scarcity will likely have serious implications for the state of Iraq for years to come. Greenhouse gas emissions per person are above the world average.

Greenhouse gas emissions 
In 2019 Iraq accounted for 8% of world methane emissions, and 0.5% of world carbon dioxide emissions. Greenhouse gas emissions per person are above the world average.
Being a country that produces massive amounts of oil, Iraq is also guilty of being one of the top 3 highest gas-flaring nations in the world.

Impacts on the natural environment

Temperature and weather changes 
In Iraq, climate change has resulted in "prolonged heat waves, erratic precipitation, higher than average temperatures and increased disaster intensity,” according to a 2018 report by the Expert Working Group on Climate-related Security Risk. Temperatures can exceed 50 degrees Celsius (122 Fahrenheit).

Baghdad is experiencing an earlier onset of 48C days.

Extreme weather events 
Drought between 2007 and 2009 was followed by very heavy rains which contributed to flooding and soil loss.

Water resources 
As water levels fall, increasing salinity of the water supply has become a concern in southern Iraq, especially in Basra.

Impacts on people

Economic impacts 
In 2019, air conditioning has become unaffordable or impossible to maintain for lower income residents, due to erratic electricity supplies.

Agriculture 
Iraq's years of drought became especially acute in 2018, at which time its land under cultivation was reduced by half. Cultivation of irrigated crops such as rice, corn and other cereals was suspended by the government; losses in rice production were estimated at 39 million dollars.

In 2019, an unusually wet winter "restored freshwater marshes of southern Iraq," and also caused widespread flooding on the Tigris and Euphrates rivers.

Power grid failure, food spoilage, and heat illness 
Iraq's power grid failed in Basra, Dhi Qar and Maysan on August 6, 2022, due to temperatures reaching as high as 51C. A public holiday was declared until the following Tuesday, the beginning of the religious festival of Muharram.

Society and culture

Security risks 
When agricultural livelihoods are disrupted, local residents in ISIS-liberated areas may become dependent on terrorist groups for access to resources.

Demonstrations and clashes over water rights have occurred in southern Iraq.

In July 2022, electricity blackouts were exacerbated by attacks on power lines by militants, combined with a reduction in power supplied by Iran. Protests were held in Baghdad and Sadr City, where residents were left without air conditioning in 50C heat.

See also 
 Climate of Iraq

External links 
 UNFCCC Iraq documents
 Nationally Determined Contributions
 Iraq emissions at Climate Trace
 Live carbon emissions from electricity generation
 Methane map

References 

Iraq
Climate of Iraq
Environment of Iraq
Iraq